Oswald Berkhan (19 March 1834 – 15 February 1917) was a German physician.

Born in Blankenburg am Harz, he was one of the initiators of the "Idioten-Anstalt Neuerkerode" (institution for people with mental illnesses), which was thought to be a sanctuary for disabled and ill people. He was also a dedicated reformer of special education schools.

He was the first person to identify dyslexia, in 1881, though the term "dyslexia" was coined several years later (in 1887) by Rudolf Berlin, who was an ophthalmologist in Stuttgart.

Berkhan died in Braunschweig.

Publications (selected)
1863: Beiträge zur Geschichte der Psychiatrie ... 1. Heft. Das Irrenwesen der Stadt Braunschweig in den früheren Jahrhunderten
1889: Ueber Störungen der Sprache und der Schriftsprache
1899: Über den angeborenen und früh erworbenen Schwachsinn
1902: Über den angeborenen oder früh sich zeigenden Wasserkopf (Hydrocephalus internus) und seine Beziehungen zur geistigen Entwickelung
1910: Das Wunderkind Christian Heinrich Heineken
1910: Otto Pöhler, das frühlesende Braunschweiger Kind

Legacy 
In 2016, Oswald Foundation, an accessibility technology company named after Berkhan, was established to build products for individuals suffering from disabilities.

See also
History of dyslexia research

References

External links
"Oswald Berkhan" in Economypoint (includes list of articles)

1834 births
1917 deaths
People from Blankenburg (Harz)
People from the Duchy of Brunswick
German psychiatrists